References to Wikipedia in popular culture have been widespread. Many parody Wikipedia's openness, with individuals vandalizing or modifying articles in nonconstructive ways. Others feature individuals using Wikipedia as a reference work, or positively comparing their intelligence to Wikipedia. In some cases, Wikipedia is not used as an encyclopedia at all, but instead serves more as a character trait or even as a game, such as Wikiracing. Wikipedia has also become culturally significant with many individuals seeing the presence of their own Wikipedia entry as a status symbol.

References to Wikipedia

Wikiality

In a July 2006 episode of the satirical comedy The Colbert Report, Stephen Colbert announced the neologism "wikiality", a portmanteau of the words Wiki and reality, for his segment "The Wørd". Colbert defined wikiality as "truth by consensus" (rather than fact), modeled after the approval-by-consensus format of Wikipedia. He ironically praised Wikipedia for following his philosophy of truthiness in which intuition and consensus is a better reflection of reality than fact:

You see, any user can change any entry, and if enough other users agree with them, it becomes true. ... If only the entire body of human knowledge worked this way. And it can, thanks to tonight's word: Wikiality. Now, folks, I'm no fan of reality, and I'm no fan of encyclopedias. I've said it before. Who is Britannica to tell me that George Washington had slaves? If I want to say he didn't, that's my right. And now, thanks to Wikipedia, it's also a fact.

We should apply these principles to all information. All we need to do is convince a majority of people that some factoid is true. ... What we're doing is bringing democracy to knowledge.

According to Stephen Colbert, together "we can all create a reality that we all can agree on; the reality that we just agreed on". During the segment, he joked: "I love Wikipedia... any site that's got a longer entry on truthiness than on Lutherans has its priorities straight." Colbert also used the segment to satirize the more general issue of whether the repetition of statements in the media leads people to believe they are true. The piece was introduced with the tagline "The Revolution Will Not Be Verified", a play on the song title "The Revolution Will Not Be Televised" referencing the lack of objective verification seen in some articles.

Colbert suggested that viewers change the elephant page to state that the number of African elephants has tripled in the last six months. The suggestion resulted in numerous incorrect changes to Wikipedia articles related to elephants and Africa. Wikipedia administrators subsequently restricted edits to the pages by anonymous and newly created user accounts.

Colbert went on to type on a laptop facing away from the camera, claiming to be making the edits to the pages himself. Because initial edits to Wikipedia corresponding to these claimed "facts" were made by a user named Stephencolbert, many believe Colbert himself vandalized several Wikipedia pages at the time he was encouraging other users to do the same. The account, whether it was Stephen Colbert himself or someone posing as him, has been blocked from Wikipedia indefinitely. Wikipedia blocked the account for violating Wikipedia's username policies (which state that using the names of celebrities as login names without permission is inappropriate), not for the vandalism, as believed.

Other instances

In art

The Wikipedia Monument, located in Słubice, Poland, is a statue honoring Wikipedia contributors.

In music
Ukrainian composer Andriy Bondarenko wrote a musical piece, "Anthem of Wikipedia", which was performed in a concert devoted to the 15th anniversary of Wikipedia in Kyiv.

In postal items

On January 14, 2011, Israel Postal Company chose to commemorate Wikipedia's 10th anniversary by issuing a special postmark and a souvenir leaf. These were the first Wikipedia-related postal items. As is customary on Wikipedia, the souvenir leaf, the postmark, and the text on the back of the souvenir leaf were created by a collaboration of volunteers. The design of the postmark was based on the work of "MT0", a Wikipedia editor.

In television episodes

In internet memes
 During the Russian Ukrainian war, a meme titled Battle of Techno House 2022, which features footage of a Russian soldier's failed effort at opening a door, went viral and was reposted millions of times. Media coverage included discussion of an initial Wikipedia page for the incident/meme, which lampooned the event by using Wikipedia formatting generally used only for actual battles, making it seem like a real battle. The belligerents in the "battle" were humorously listed as "Russian Soldier" and "store door"    with the battle results referred to as a "decisive door victory"   and "pride" referred to as one of the Russian casualties. The humorous content was later removed from the Wikipedia page.

Contexts
Wikipedia is not always referenced in the same way. The ways described below are some of the ways it has been mentioned.

Citations of Wikipedia in culture
People who are known to have used or recommended Wikipedia as a reference source include comedian Rosie O'Donnell, and Rutgers University sociology professor Ted Goertzel.
Various people including Sir Ian McKellen, Nicolas Cage, and Marcus Brigstocke have criticized or commented about Wikipedia's articles about themselves.

In politics
In June 2011, Wikipedia received attention for attempts by editors to change the "Paul Revere" article to fit Sarah Palin's accounting of events during a campaign bus tour. The New York Times reported that the article "had half a million page views" by June 10, and "after all the attention and arguments, the article is now much longer ... and much better sourced ... than before Palin's remarks."
In a speech given on October 28, 2013, to support Ken Cuccinelli for the candidacy of the governor of Virginia, Senator Rand Paul appeared to include close paraphrasing of the Wikipedia entry on the film Gattaca in his comments on eugenics, as noted by MSNBC host Rachel Maddow.
In April 2015, The Guardian reported claims that British Conservative party chairman Grant Shapps or a person working under Shapps' orders had edited Wikipedia pages about Shapps and other members of British Parliament during the runup to the 2015 election, to which Shapps had denied involvement.
In October 2018, Jackson A. Cosko, a former staff member for US Senator Maggie Hassan, misused Hassan's computers, after he had been fired, to edit Wikipedia to dox several Congresspersons, including Sen. Mitch McConnell. Cosko pleaded guilty in April 2019.
In February 2022, journalists at The Independent found that text from Wikipedia articles on Constantinople and the list of largest cities throughout history had been lifted by civil servants from the UK's Department for Levelling Up, Housing and Communities and placed verbatim into the government's Levelling Up White Paper.

Wikipedia as comedic material
Wikipedia is parodied at several websites, including Uncyclopedia and Encyclopedia Dramatica.
In May 2006, British chat show host Paul O'Grady received an inquiry from a viewer regarding information given on his Wikipedia page, to which he responded, "Wikipedia? Sounds like a skin disease."
Comedian Zach Galifianakis claimed to look himself up on Wikipedia in an interview with The Badger Herald, stating about himself, "...I'm looking at Wikipedia right now. Half Greek, half redneck, around 6-foot-4. And that's about it... The 6-foot-4 thing may be a little bit off. Actually, it's 4-foot-6."

General information source
Slate magazine compared Wikipedia to the fictional device The Hitchhiker's Guide to the Galaxy from the series of the same name by Douglas Adams. "The parallels between The Hitchhiker's Guide (as found in Adams' original BBC radio series and novels) and Wikipedia are so striking, it's a wonder that the author's rabid fans don't think he invented time travel. Since its editor was perennially out to lunch, the Guide was amended 'by any passing stranger who happened to wander into the empty offices on an afternoon and saw something worth doing.' This anonymous group effort ends up outselling Encyclopedia Galactica even though 'it has many omissions and contains much that is apocryphal, or at least wildly inaccurate.'" This comparison of fictional documents in the series, is not unlike the mainstream comparisons between Wikipedia and professional Encyclopedias.

Criticism

The comedy website Something Awful once featured Wikipedia's article on Knuckles the Echidna as an ALOD (Awful Link of the Day), satirizing the amount of detail that sometimes goes into seemingly irrelevant topics. The link description adds that the article is longer than each of the articles about Echidnas, the Internet, the internal combustion engine, William Shakespeare and Western culture. The topic was also satirized in the front page, which featured a fake Wikipedia style article about Albert "Al" Calavicci from the TV series Quantum Leap written by Something Awful contributor David Thorpe. Thorpe elsewhere linked the existence of such articles to Asperger syndrome, stating "Don't make fun of Aspergers. If it weren't for Aspergers, we wouldn't have 20-page Wikipedia articles about Knuckles the Echidna."

Wikipedia was also mocked in a December 4, 2006, update on Something Awful. The update detailed the life of a talk page on Wikipedia, and mocked the neutrality, copyright, naming, quality, and personal disputes that the pages are beholden to. The update also linked Wikipedia usage to Asperger syndrome once more, with one fictional editor claiming to have a case of the syndrome twice as powerful as that of another fictional editor. In a 2007 Awful Link of the Day, a Wikipedia article was featured again, this time on the villains of Codename: Kids Next Door. Once again, it calls out the detail put onto seemingly irrelevant topics, citing a discussion in said article's talk page about the subjectiveness of the speed of certain characters. Something Awful founder Richard Kyanka then mockingly offered to write up a speed comparison of the KND characters Big Badolescent and Cheese Shogun Roquefort, citing a fake episode called "episode 35, 'I Am a 38-Year Old Man With Several Obese Cats and an Empty Life I Futilely Try to Fill With Children's Cartoons'".

Claims of negative impact of Wikipedia on culture
Andrew Keen's 2007 book The Cult of the Amateur: How Today's Internet Is Killing Our Culture asserted the proliferation of user-generated content on Wikipedia obscured and devalued traditional, higher-quality information outlets.

See also

Truth in Numbers? Everything, According to Wikipedia, 2010 documentary
Wikipedia in the media
 Wikipedia in webcomics

Notes
  "Loxodonta", "African Forest Elephant", "African Bush Elephant", "Pachydermata", "Babar the Elephant", "Elephant", "Oregon","George Washington", "Latchkey kid", "Serial killer", "Hitler", "The Colbert Report" and "Stephen Colbert" are/were temporarily protected. "Mûmak" (formerly at "Oliphaunt") has also been vandalized.

References

Topics in culture
Culture
WMF-COM
Articles containing video clips